The Poplifugia or Populifugia (Latin: the people's flight), was a festival of ancient Rome celebrated on July 5, according to Varro, in commemoration of the flight of the Romans, when the inhabitants of Ficuleae and Fidenae appeared in arms against them, shortly after the burning of the city by the Gauls (see Battle of the Allia); the traditional victory of the Romans, which followed, was commemorated on July 7 (called the Nonae Caprotinae as a feast of Juno Caprotina), and on the next day was the Vitulatio, supposed to mark the thank-offering of the pontifices for the event. Macrobius, who wrongly places the Poplifugia on the nones, says that it commemorated a flight before the Tuscans, while Dionysius refers its origin to the time when the patricians murdered Romulus after the people had fled from a public assembly on account of rain and darkness.

Notes

References
 This entry incorporates public domain text originally from (eds. William Smith, LLD, William Wayte, G. E. Marindin), Dictionary of Greek and Roman Antiquities, Albemarle Street, London. John Murray. 1890.

Ancient Roman festivals
July observances